Balázs Vincze (born 27 June 1967) is a Hungarian water polo player. He competed at the 1988 Summer Olympics, the 1992 Summer Olympics and the 1996 Summer Olympics.

See also
 List of World Aquatics Championships medalists in water polo

References

External links
 

1967 births
Living people
Hungarian male water polo players
Olympic water polo players of Hungary
Water polo players at the 1988 Summer Olympics
Water polo players at the 1992 Summer Olympics
Water polo players at the 1996 Summer Olympics
Water polo players from Budapest